Supernode may refer to:
 Supernode (networking), a network proxy in peer-to-peer networks
 Supernode (circuit), a theoretical construct in circuit theory
 A construct in Nodal analysis, a circuit analysis technique used in electrical engineering.